Ooni Gbanlare was the 39th Ooni of Ife, a paramount traditional ruler of Ile Ife, the ancestral home of the Yorubas. He succeeded Ooni Akinmoyero and was succeeded by  
Ooni Gbegbaaje.

References

Oonis of Ife
Yoruba history